Angul is a Vidhan Sabha constituency of Angul district, Odisha, India.

Constituent Areas 
Sources:
Angul
Nalconagar
23 GPs of Angul block: Khalari, Kangulabentapur, Angar Bandha, Badakera, Rantalei, Chheliapada, Baluakata, Kumurisingha, Inkarbandha, Sankhapur, Pokatunga, Talagarh, Baragounia, Basala, Bedasasan, Khinda, Gadatarasa, Badakantakul, Dhokuta, Balasingha, Bantala, Nandapur and Balanga
13 GPs of Banarpal block: Bauligad, Bhogabereni, Bonda, Budhapank, Fulpada, Garhasantri, Gotamara, Balaramprasad, Kulad, Mahidharpur, Nuahata, Talmul and Tulasipal.

Elected Members

16 elections held during 1951 to 2014. Elected members from the Angul constituency are:

1951: (14): Hrushikesh Tripathy (Congress)
1957: (53): Kumuda Chandra Singh (Independent)
1961: (79): Kumuda Chandra Singh (Congress)
1967: (139): Kumuda Chandra Singh (Congress)
1971: (139): Debaraja Sahu (Utkal Congress)
1974: (116): Adwait Prasad Singh (Utkal Congress)
1977: (116): Adwait Prasad Singh (Janata Party)
1980: (116): Santosh Kumar Pradhan (Congress-I)
1985: (116): Prafulla Misra (Congress)
1990: (116): Adwait Prasad Singh (Janata Dal) 
1995: (116): Ramesh Jena (Congress) 
2000: (116): Adwait Prasad Singh (BJD)
2004: (116): Rajani Kant Singh (BJD)
2009: (61): Rajani Kant Singh (BJD)
2014: (61): Rajani Kant Singh (BJD)
2019: (61): Rajani Kant Singh (BJD)

2009 Election Result
In 2009 election, Biju Janata Dal candidate Rajani Kant Singh defeated Indian National Congress candidate Sangram Keshari Mishra by a margin of 20,463 votes.

2014 Election Result
In 2014 election, Biju Janata Dal candidate Rajani Kant Singh defeated Indian National Congress candidate Pratap Chandra Pradhan by a margin of 20,343 votes.

2019 Election Result

Notes

References

Assembly constituencies of Odisha
Politics of Angul district
Dhenkanal district